Nicholas J. Pritzker is an American real estate and venture entrepreneur in San Francisco, California. He served as the Chairman of the board and CEO of the Hyatt Development Corporation. He is a member of the wealthy Pritzker family, who owned chewing-tobacco giant Conwood before selling it to Reynolds American.

Early life and education
Pritzker was born in Chicago on 16 October 1945, son of Jack Nicholas Pritzker (1903-1979) and Rhoda Goldberg Pritzker (1914-2007). He attended Reed College, Lake Forest College and the London School of Film. He went on to receive a J.D. from the University of Chicago.

Career
Pritzker assumed responsibility of Hyatt Hotels Corporation in Chicago, Illinois after working with his father, Jack Pritzker, in real estate. He served as the president of the company and oversaw international hotel projects. Pritzker also served on Hyatt Hotel Corporation's board of directors from 1980 to 2007. He is an independent entrepreneur and co-founder of Tao Capital. The investment firm primarily invests in sustainable energy and disruptive technology businesses. Tao Capital's early investments include Tesla Motors, Uber, SpaceX, Twist Bioscience, Aquion Energy, Atlantica Hotels, United Record Pressing and Foundations Recovery Network. Pritzker is on the board of JUUL Labs since 2017, an electronic cigarette company.

Philanthropy
He has served on various non-profit boards including as Vice Chairman of Conservation International, Chairman of the Grand Victoria Foundation, Vice Chairman of Clean Energy Trust, and Chairman of the Libra Foundation.

Personal life
Pritzker is married to Susan Stowell Pritzker and they have four children. They live in Nicasio, California.  Nick is a loyal follower of the band Widespread Panic & has not missed a show since 2002.

References

1945 births
Living people
American billionaires
American people of Lithuanian-Jewish descent
American people of Ukrainian-Jewish descent
Businesspeople from Chicago
People from Marin County, California
Hyatt people
Lake Forest College alumni
Nicholas J. Pritzker
University of Chicago Law School alumni
University of Chicago alumni
Philanthropists from Illinois
21st-century American Jews